Ojibways of Onigaming First Nation is an Ojibwe or Ontario Saulteaux First Nation located in Kenora District, Ontario near Nestor Falls, Ontario. Together with the Big Grassy First Nation, Ojibways of Onigaming First Nation is a successor apparent to the former Assabaska Band of Saulteaux. Total registered population in February, 2012, was 737, of which the on-reserve population was 445.  The First Nation is a member of the Anishinabeg of Kabapikotawangag Resource Council, a regional tribal council that is a member of the Grand Council of Treaty 3.

Reserves

The First Nation has for itself six reserves:
  Sabaskong Bay 35C,
  Sabaskong Bay 35D, which serves as their main reserve,
  Sabaskong Bay 35F,
  Sabaskong Bay 35H,
  Assabaska, which is shared with Big Grassy First Nation, and
  Agency 30, which is shared with 12 other First Nations.

Governance
Ojibways of Onigaming First Nation is governed by Chief Jeffrey Copenace and five Councillors: Megan Bob, Kathy Jack, Shawn Kelly, Candi Kelly and Bill Arch. Their elected two-year term ends in 2023.

History
Seven Generations Education Institute (SGEI) is an Aboriginal-owned and controlled post-secondary institution co-founded by the ten bands in the Rainy Lake Tribal area in 1985. The ten bands are: Big Grassy, Big Island, Couchiching, Lac La Croix, Naicatchewenin, Nigigoonsiminikaaning, Ojibways of Onigaming, Rainy River, Seine River and Mitaanjigaming. Each of the ten bands appointed one member to a Board of Directors of Seven Generations Education Institute, which functions with the leadership of the Executive Director.

References

External links
 profile from INAC

First Nations governments in Ontario
Saulteaux
Communities in Kenora District